A sting jet is a meteorological phenomenon which has been postulated to cause some of the most damaging winds in extratropical cyclones, developing according to the Shapiro-Keyser model (though perhaps not exclusively) of oceanic cyclones.

Concept

Following reanalysis of the UK Great Storm of 1987, led by Professor Keith Browning at the University of Reading, researchers identified a mesoscale flow where the most damaging winds were shown to be emanating from the evaporating tip of the hooked cloud head on the southern flank of the cyclone. This cloud, hooked like a scorpion's tail, gives the wind region its name the "sting jet".

It is thought that a zone of strong winds, originating from within the mid-tropospheric cloud head of an explosively deepening depression, are enhanced further as the "jet" descends, drying out and evaporating a clear path through snow and ice particles. The evaporative cooling leading to the air within the jet becoming denser, leading to an acceleration of the downward flow towards the tip of the cloud head when it begins to hook around the cyclone centre. Windspeeds in excess of 80 kn (150 km/h) can be associated with the sting jet.

Sting jets are generally about 10 to 20 kilometres wide.

Sting jets have been reproduced in high-resolution runs with the mesoscale version of the Unified Model of weather prediction. The sting jet is distinct from the usual strong-wind region associated with the warm conveyor belt and main cold front. There are indications that conditional symmetric instability also plays a role in its formation but the importance of these processes remains to be quantified.

One North Atlantic storm, Cyclone Tilo (November 6–11, 2007) was analysed and found not to display a sting jet, despite generating strong surface winds and displaying a fractured cold front.

Globally
The sting jet mechanism has been considered less significant in Pacific Northwest windstorms which occur over the Pacific Ocean (which impact the Northwestern United States and British Columbia). Evidence of mesoscale high wind areas has not been noted in most large windstorms occurring there, along with cloud geometry associated with the phenomena being absent in satellite imagery of major Pacific Northwest storms. Although a case study of a sting jet in the region has been produced. High resolution computer models of the phenomena have also shown realistically strong winds without the need for sting jet dynamics.

List of sting jet cyclones

Sting jets can be spotted on satellite images as they develop, due to the end of the cold conveyor being marked by a scorpion-like hook-shaped cloud with a point at the end. About a dozen confirmed sting jets have been identified since the Great Storm of 1987 which led to their discovery. See the associated list.

External links 
 What is a sting jet? David M. Schultz and Keith A. Browning, Weather 72 (3) March 2017
 The Sting Jet: Forecasting the damaging winds in European Cyclones, UK Met Office
 The 1987 Great Storm - What is a Sting Jet?, UK Met Office
 EUMeTrain webcast, "Sting Jets" Prof. Geraint Vaughan, School of Earth, Atmospheric and Environmental Sciences, The University of Manchester
 Sting jets in extratropical cyclones: a review, Clark & Gray, Quarterly Journal of the Royal Meteorological Society, Volume 144, Issue 713 April 2018 Part B Pages 943-969

Further reading
 Quarterly Journal of the Royal Meteorological Society 140: 96 – 110, January 2014 Idealised simulations of sting-jet cyclones
 Do North Pacific sting jet cyclones exist?
 NOAA Conditional Symmetric Iinstability (CSI) homepage

References

European windstorms
Storm
Wind
Atmospheric dynamics